Herta Wunder (March 4, 1913 – January 28, 1992) was a German freestyle swimmer, born in Leipzig, who competed in the 1928 Summer Olympics.

In 1928 she finished fourth with the German relay team in the 4x100 metre freestyle relay competition.

External links

1913 births
1992 deaths
Swimmers from Leipzig
German female swimmers
Olympic swimmers of Germany
Swimmers at the 1928 Summer Olympics